Nicolae Cornel Ilea (born 29 November 1969) is a retired Romanian football striker. He scored the only goal of the 1994 Cupa României final against FC Universitatea Craiova, which helped Gloria Bistrița win the first trophy in the club's history.

Honours
Universitatea Cluj 
Divizia B: 1991–92
Gloria Bistrița 
Cupa României: 1993–94
Debrecen
Magyar Kupa: 1998–99

Notes

References

1969 births
Living people
Romanian footballers
FC Olimpia Satu Mare players
FC Universitatea Cluj players
ACF Gloria Bistrița players
Debreceni VSC players
MTK Budapest FC players
Fehérvár FC players
Nyíregyháza Spartacus FC players
Association football forwards
Liga I players
Liga II players
Liga III players
Nemzeti Bajnokság I players
Nemzeti Bajnokság II players
Romanian expatriate footballers
Expatriate footballers in Hungary
Romanian expatriate sportspeople in Hungary
Sportspeople from Satu Mare